Riverland Community College is a public community college with three campuses in southeastern Minnesota: Albert Lea, Austin, and Owatonna. Founded in 1940, Riverland offers a variety of educational programs and courses to over 4,900 students annually through traditional, hybrid, and online delivery systems.

The college offers an array of academic degrees, including bachelor's degrees through partner institutions, Associate in Arts (two-year transfer degrees), Associate in Arts with Emphasis, Associate in Fine Arts, diplomas, and certificates.

Riverland Community College is accredited by the Higher Learning Commission and is one of 31 institutions in the Minnesota State Colleges and Universities (now Minnesota State) system, Minnesota's largest provider of higher education.

History

1940: Austin Junior College
According to Academic Dean Ruben Meland’s document “Austin Junior College – Nine Years of Community Service”, Austin Junior College opened on September 3, 1940. Enrollment was 138 freshmen, served by a faculty of five full-time and four part-time instructors.

1951: Austin Area Vocational-Technical School
According to the “Selected Report on Austin Junior College Prepared for Minnesota Junior College Board dated December 1963”, “The Austin Area Vocational-Technical School was established in Austin, Minnesota as a part of the public school system in 1951 and at present (Dec. 1963) provides post high school training to an enrollment of about 250 in: Carpentry, Farm Equipment Mechanics, Welding, Machine Shop (tool & die), Automotive Mechanics, Auto Body Rebuilding, Industrial Electronics, Practical Nursing, and Cosmetology (beauty school).”

1966: Austin Junior College moves to new location, changes name to Austin State Junior College

Ruben Meland, college dean and president, wrote in his memoirs, “In June 1966, we moved our offices into the new administration wing and we opened for classes September 22, 1966, (our 26th year) with about 850 students and a faculty of 40. At this same time our name was officially changed to Austin State Junior College. The new college campus was officially dedicated on January 29, 1967.”

1968: Albert Lea Area Vocational-Technical School established

According to “A Brief History of the MN AVTI System and Directors”, “Albert Lea was tentatively approved by the State Board of Education on September 30, 1968. They received the final approval on November 4, 1968.” Mr. Wayne Broecker is the Director of the AVTI at Albert Lea.”

1971: Austin State Junior College Owatonna Extension Center opens
An Owatonna People’s Press advertisement dated September 16, 1971, reads, “Austin State Junior College Owatonna Extension Center, classes starting Monday, September 20, 1971 at 12:30 p.m.” An Owatonna People’s Press advertisement dated November 17, 1971 reads, “Let’s start college in Owatonna, Minnesota, Austin State Junior College. Owatonna campus located on the beautiful grounds of the State School.”

1972: Austin Area Vocational-Technical School changes name to Austin Area Vocational-Technical Institute
An undated document created for the Mower County Historical Society states, “During February of 1972 the move from the various sites started and the total moving of all programs to the new Austin Area Vocational-Technical School were completed in March of 1972. It was also during this time that the State Department of Education changed the names of all Area Vocational-Technical Schools to Area Vocational-Technical Institutes.”

1985: Owatonna Higher Education Center opens
A March 3, 1998, memo from Tim McManimon, Owatonna community leader, to John Gedker, college president, reads, “Riverland Community College has served the Owatonna area for the past 13 years, primarily in the area of customized training for business and industry. It is the Owatonna community vision to create a seamless link between education, work and the community."

1991: Minnesota Riverland Technical College
According to “Historical Overview 1945–1995, 50 Years Minnesota Technical College System”, “Minnesota Riverland Technical College, District #2501, was formed on July 1, 1991. MRTC is  the Austin, Faribault, and Rochester campuses and the Owatonna Technical Training Center.”

1996: Riverland Community College established on July 1, 1996
A November 1996 memorandum from John Gedker, college president, reads, “Riverland Community College was established on July 1, 1996. Austin Community College (established in 1940 as Austin Junior College), Riverland Technical College–Austin (established in 1951 as Austin Area Vocational School) and Owatonna campuses, and South Central Technical College–Albert Lea (established in 1968 as Albert Lea Technical Education Center) campuses merged to form Riverland Community College.”

2001: Owatonna College & University Center
According to a March 22, 2003, Owatonna People’s Press article, “January 14, 2002 was the first day classes were held at Owatonna College and University Center. Currently, Riverland is the host institution at OCUC and also offers classes at the site. Concordia University, St. Paul; Minnesota State University, Mankato; Southwest State University; University of St. Thomas; and South Central Technical College also offer classes.”

2008: The Owatonna College And University Center (OCUC) is acquired by Minnesota State
The OCUC Celebration brochure dated February 17, 2009, states: “In April 2008, Gov. Tim Pawlenty signed into law a bonding bill that allowed the Minnesota State Colleges and Universities system to acquire the Owatonna College & University Center. On December 31, 2008, MnSCU finalized the sale. Three Partners. One Purpose. Minnesota State University, Mankato, Riverland Community College, and South Central College."

Notable alumni
 Alvin Baldus, U.S. Representative from Wisconsin, 1975-1981
 Sandy Wollschlager, Minnesota state representative and chemist

Notes

External links
 

Two-year colleges in the United States
Education in Mower County, Minnesota
Educational institutions established in 1940
Education in Freeborn County, Minnesota
Community colleges in Minnesota
Buildings and structures in Austin, Minnesota
NJCAA athletics
1940 establishments in Minnesota